RK Borec (HC Borec) is a team handball club from Veles, North Macedonia. In the 1990s they had their biggest success winning the League and one Cup title. They compete in the Macedonian Handball Super League.

Noted Macedonian handball player Pepi Manaskov started his career at RK Borec.

Accomplishments

Domestic competitions 

 Macedonian Handball Super League
 Winners (4): 1965,1967, 1985,1995

 Macedonian Handball Cup 
 Winners (2): 1968,1994

European competitions 
EHF Champions League 1/16 Final: 1 
 1995-96

EHF Cup Winners' Cup 1/8 Final: 1
 1994-95

References

External links
RFM Profile
EHF Profile
Fan Club Forum
Macedonian Handball Federation

Borec
Sport in Veles, North Macedonia